Mali or Gaktai is a Papuan language  spoken in East New Britain Province on the island of New Britain, Papua New Guinea.

Dialects
There are two dialects of Mali:

Arongda dialect (standard dialect; with two groups), spoken in the mountains, including in Marunga village in Sinivit Rural LLG, East New Britain Province
Abilta dialect, spoken along the coast

Phonology
The phonology of the Mali language:

Consonants

Vowels

Noun classes
Mali makes use of noun classes. Below are some Mali noun class paradigms, using the noun root amēng ‘tree’ as an example:

{| 
! Noun class !! Singular !! Dual !! Plural !! Gloss
|-
! Masculine (m)
| amēng-ka || amēng-iom || amēng || ‘slender tree’
|-
! Feminine (f)
| amēng-ki || amēng-vem || amēng || ‘large full grown tree’
|-
! Diminutive (dim)
| amēng-ini || amēng-ithom || amēng-ithong || ‘stick’
|-
! Reduced (rcd)
| amēng-ēm || amēng-vam || amēng-vap || ‘tree stump’
|-
! Flat (flat)
| ― || ― || ― || ―
|-
! Excised (exc)
| amēng-igl || amēng-iglem || amēng-igleng || ‘plank’
|-
! Long (long)
| amēng-vēt || amēng-imelēm || amēng-imelēk || ‘pole’
|-
! Extended (ext)
| amēng-ia || amēng-inēm || amēng-inēk || ‘large log’
|-
! Count neutral (cn)
| amēng ||  ||  || ‘wood or trees’
|}

Bibliography

References

Languages of East New Britain Province
Baining languages